GOF may refer to:
 Gain-of-function, a property of a genetic mutation that changes the gene product such that its effect gets stronger (enhanced activation) or even is superseded by a different and abnormal function
 Galaxy on Fire, a video game series
 Gamers Outreach Foundation, an American philanthropic organization
 Gamo-Gofa-Dawro language, native to Ethiopia
 Gang of Four (disambiguation)
 General Operations Force, of the Malaysian police
 Golf Street railway station, in Angus, Scotland
 Goodness of fit
 Grand Orient de France, a Masonic organization in France
 Gulf of Finland
 Harry Potter and the Goblet of Fire, a 2000 novel by J. K. Rowling

See also 
 An Gof, a Cornish militant organization